The R182 road is a regional road in Ireland linking Castleblayney and the Republic of Ireland–United Kingdom border in County Monaghan. The road continues in Northern Ireland as the A25.

See also 

 Roads in Ireland
 National primary road
 National secondary road

References 

Regional roads in the Republic of Ireland
Roads in County Monaghan